Klára Hricová (born 25 November 1999) is a Czech female canoeist who won three gold medals at individual senior level at the European Wildwater Championships.

References

External links
 

1999 births
Living people
Czech female canoeists
Place of birth missing (living people)